A TFSA is a tax-free savings account.

TFSA may also refer to:

 Trifluoromethanesulfonic acid, a sulfonic acid
 Turkish-backed Free Syrian Army, an armed Syrian opposition structure